Mukhiana is a village in Jhang District, Punjab, Pakistan located near the Jhang Chiniot road, 5 kilometres from Shabbir Abad. It is the village of the Bharwana tribe, a sub-caste of Sial. The Bharwana tribe has its forts and mansions in the surroundings of Mukhiana. Mukhiana is also known as Chak Sialan.

Populated places in Jhang District
Jhang District